Beyond is the eighth studio album by the alternative rock band Dinosaur Jr. It was their first LP in a decade after 1997's Hand It Over, and the first album by the original lineup since 1988's Bug.

Promotion 
The band planned a full world tour in 2007 and played "Almost Ready" on the Late Show with David Letterman to support their album. A music video was made for "Been There All the Time", featuring Sonic Youth front-man Thurston Moore and his daughter, Coco. It was directed by Matt Dillon.

Release 
The album was released through Fat Possum Records in the US and through the Play It Again, Sam label in Europe, Australia, New Zealand and Japan. It was also released in Ukraine through Moon Records. Both Fat Possum and PIAS released limited edition versions of it containing an extra 7 inch with the 2:47 track "Yer Son". The respective labels would go on to reissue the album in 2014, 2015 and 2016, the former even releasing a downloadable 256kbit/s MP3 version of it.

Reception 
The album has a Metacritic score of 79 based on 31 reviews, indicating "[g]enerally favorable reviews". Zach Baron of Pitchfork gave the album a very positive review, comparing it favorably to other comebacks of the year. He writes: "Beneath Beyond's crystalline production is the sublime result: years and years of weariness and aging and conflict put back into the bottle. [...] Less a theme park of the past and more of an actual trip there [...] Beyond is nostalgic for everything but the band's own glory days. If anything, it's an exercise in making their entire twenty-year output sound contemporary again." Stephen Thomas Erlewine wrote that the "very existence of this new album is a surprise, but the real shock is that Beyond is a flat-out great record, a startling return to form for J Mascis as a guitarist and songwriter and Dinosaur Jr. as a band." He found the album to be less noisy and more stylistically diverse than the earlier efforts of the trio ("this sounds like the album that could have been released instead of Green Mind if Lou had stuck around, or if Dinosaur made the kind of grand major-label debut many expected them to deliver in the days before Nevermind.") He also finds the album to be "very different" from their past efforts "in that for the first time, Mascis is assertive about his talent. He sounds engaged -- in music, in life [...] -- and it gives the album a powerful sense of purpose that the classic Dinosaur albums were lacking by their very design." He concludes by writing that "Beyond isn't merely a worthy album from a reunited band, it's simply a great record by any standard."

A mixed review came from Q, who wrote that "The spark that made initial albums such as Bug so special is still missing." [May 2007, p. 123]

Accolades

In popular culture 
"Almost Ready" was used on the Major League Baseball 2K8 and Skate 3 soundtracks, and "Pick Me Up" is downloadable content from the Rock Band series. The songs "Almost Ready" and "Crumble" were used in Alien Workshop's skateboarding film Mind Field.

Track listing

Personnel
Dinosaur Jr.
J Mascis – lead vocals, guitars, production, writer (1-3, 5-9, 11)
Lou Barlow – bass, vocals, writer (4, 10)
Murph – drums, percussion
Technical
Rick Myers – design, artwork
John Agnello – sound engineer
Justin Pizzoferrato – sound engineer
Greg Calbi – mastering
John Agnello – mixing
Burk Uzzle – cover photography
Philipp Virus – photography
Recorded and mixed at Bisquiteen, Amherst, MA.
Mastered at Sterling Sound, NYC.

Charts
Beyond debuted at #69 on the Billboard 200 and peaked at #19 on the Top Rock Albums chart. In 2012 it was awarded a double silver certification from the Independent Music Companies Association, which indicated sales of at least 40,000 copies throughout Europe.

References

External links
 Beyond at Metacritic
Short story review of Beyond at The Wheel's Still in Spin

2007 albums
Dinosaur Jr. albums
Fat Possum Records albums